The Kvarner Gulf (or ,  or ), sometimes also Kvarner Bay, is a bay in the northern Adriatic Sea, located between the Istrian peninsula and the northern Croatian Littoral mainland. The bay is a part of Croatia's internal waters.

The largest islands within the Kvarner are Cres, Krk, Pag, Rab and Lošinj.

The bay is notable for its depth (more than 100 meters), which allows for the city of Rijeka at its northernmost point to have a sea port that can accommodate Capesize ships.

The bay is also home to many beaches and tourist locations because of its beautiful waters and warm climate.

See also
 Geography of Croatia

References

Sources
 

Bays of Croatia
Liburnia